Dehin (also Romanized as Dehīn and Dahīn) is a village in Shahrabad Rural District, in the Central District of Firuzkuh County, Tehran Province, Iran. At the 2006 census, its population was 241, in 63 families.

References 

Populated places in Firuzkuh County